The Turağayçay is one of the tributaries of Tartarchay located de jure in Tartar District of Azerbaijan.

Overview

See also
Rivers and lakes in Azerbaijan
Tartarchay
Levçay
Ağdabançay
Qarqarçay

References

Tartar District
Rivers of Azerbaijan